Endrio Leoni (born 22 August 1968 in Dolo) is a retired road bicycle racer from Italy, who was a professional rider from 1990 to 2002. He only served teams from his native country. Leoni twice won the Scheldeprijs (2000 and 2001).

Major results
Sources:

1987
 1st GP Città di Venezia
1989
 1st Vicenza–Bionde
 7th Gran Premio della Liberazione
1990 
 1st Stage 3 Ruota d'Oro
 3rd GP Bruno Beghelli
1991
 9th Overall Giro di Puglia
1992
 1st Stages 1 & 11 Giro d'Italia
 1st Stage 5 Settimana Internazionale di Coppi e Bartali
 1st Stage 3 Settimana Lombarda
1993
 1st Stage 5 Tirreno–Adriatico
 1st Stage 1 Giro di Puglia
1994
 1st Stages 1a & 5 Giro d'Italia
 1st Stage 4 Vuelta a España
 1st Stage 1 Ruta Mexico
1996
 3rd Road race, National Road Championships
1997
 1st Giro del Lago Maggiore
 1st Stage 1 Tirreno–Adriatico
 1st Stage 1 Ronde van Nederland
 2nd Trofeo Luis Puig
1998
 1st Stage 1 Giro della Provincia di Reggio Calabri
 2nd Giro del Friuli
1999
 1st Gran Premio della Costa Etruschi
 1st Stage 3 Volta a Portugal
2000
 1st Scheldeprijs
 1st GP de Denain Porte du Hainaut
 1st Poreč Trophy
 1st Stage 3 Vuelta a Murcia
 2nd Gran Premio della Costa Etruschi
 4th Clásica de Almería
2001
 1st Scheldeprijs
 1st Stages 2 & 8 Tirreno–Adriatico
 1st  Points classification Volta ao Algarve
1st Stages 1, 2 & 4  
 1st Stage 2 Vuelta a Murcia
 1st Stage 1a Vuelta a Castilla y León
 1st  Points classification Vuelta a Aragón
2002
 1st Stages 1 & 3 Vuelta a Andalucía

Grand Tour general classification results timeline

References

External links
 

1968 births
Living people
Italian male cyclists
Italian Giro d'Italia stage winners
People from Dolo
Cyclists from the Metropolitan City of Venice